The book series The Saga of Darren Shan features humans, vampires and fantasy characters of other types.

Overview 
 A dark grey cell indicates that the character was not in the property or that the character's presence in the property has yet to be announced.
 A Main indicates that a character had a starring role in the property.
 A Recurring indicates the character appeared in two or more times within the property.
 A Guest indicates the character appeared once in the property.

Vampires

Darren Shan
Darren Shan is the main character of his diary, which is expressed from his point of view. As explained in the last book, "Sons of Destiny", the diary was supposedly transferred from Mr. Tall to the author.

 In the first book, Cirque Du Freak/Cirque Du Freak: A Living Nightmare, "Darren" says he used no real names in the books. These are just the names used by him in substitution of the real names of the key players in his life (he does this for their protection and in fear of being discovered for his true self).

Darren became enamored with Larten Crepsley's spider Madam Octa when he went to the Cirque du Freak, where he also learned vampires were real, Mr. Crepsley was one, and his best friend Steve Leonard wanted to become one. However, when Steve was bitten by Madam Octa, Darren was forced to seek the help of Mr. Crepsley, who agreed on the condition that Darren become his vampire assistant instead. Forced to leave his family, Darren died with his master's help, and joined Cirque du Freak. Many years later, he leaves for Vampire Mountain with his mentor, where he is forced to take part in the Trials of Initiation to prove his worth. He fails in the fourth trial, and decides to escape execution with help from his friend, pacifist and soon to be Prince Kurda Smahlt. As they flee, they come across a group of Vampaneze Kurda has smuggled into the mountain, intending to take it by force, in the hope his people would be spared from the rise of the Lord of the Vampaneze, who has finally appeared. Barely escaping alive, Darren is instrumental in foiling Kurda's plot, and made a Prince for his bravery. He learns after several years at war that he is one of three hunters with the power to kill the Lord of the Vampaneze before the vampires are eradicated. Near the beginning of the quest he is told by Lady Evanna that a Lord of the Shadows will rise at the end of the war between the two clans, and only his identity has yet to be determined - he will either be the Lord of the Vampaneze, or Darren himself. Several months later, the hunters are caught in an elaborate trap created by the Lord of the Vampaneze, resulting ultimately in Mr. Crepsley's death, and Darren learning that Steve Leonard is the Lord. The final confrontation comes two years later, with Darren killing Steve in their hometown. Here he and Steve learn that they were created and manipulated by Mr. Tiny their whole lives, so that the victor could throw the world into chaos. Defying his destiny, Darren drags himself and Steve into a river, where both drown and end up in the Lake of Souls. In the far future, Darren is reincarnated by Mr. Tiny as a Little Person like his friend Harkat, in a deal struck with Lady Evanna, who wishes to save Darren from a fate she does not believe he deserves. Darren is then sent back in time to the Cirque du Freak the night he went with Steve so that after the show, he scares off his past self when Steve is trying to make a deal with Larten Crepsley, so he never embarks on his dark path. Unbeknownst to Mr. Tiny, however, Evanna gives him one last weapon: the diary he has kept his whole life, updated to include his death and the extent of Mr. Tiny's evil. Darren gives his diary to Mr. Tall, instructing the latter to give it to his older, normal self, so that he will publish it as a fictional book (apparently the Darren Shan series itself) in hope one day the Vampire and Vampaneze clans would read it and uncover Des Tiny's scheme. In the end, Darren the boy gets to live a normal life, and the soul of the Vampire goes to Paradise. Darren is portrayed by Chris Massoglia in the 2009 movie adaptation.

Larten Crepsley
Larten Crepsley is the vampire that made Darren Shan his assistant after he saved Darren's friend, Steve (in exchange for Darren's pledge to become his assistant; there is a larger story attached to this, see Cirque Du Freak). He is over 6ft tall with orange cropped hair (which was dyed when he was a child), is illiterate, and has one long scar running down his left cheek, but is shown with three in the movie. Evanna, a sorceress, caused the scar due to Larten's attempt at kissing her in his youth. He is suspected to be about 180–200 years old and was once a Vampire General. Larten abruptly resigned his position following his killing of his blood-brother Wester Flack, who had murdered a human Larten loved in order to drive the vampire clan into war with the vampaneze. While he remained highly respected within the clan, Larten chose to live a simple existence as a member of the Cirque du Freak, in self-imposed exile from the vampires until he came across Steve Leonard and Darren Shan. He was unknowingly influenced by Mr Tiny from afar into testing both children to become his assistants. He rejected Steve for his evil blood, but became interested in Darren when the boy stole his spider Madam Octa. Larten blackmailed Darren into becoming his half-vampire assistant when Steve was bitten by the spider, and helped Darren fake his death. He later acknowledged that his decision was a poor one, as he had deliberately isolated the child for no obvious purpose. Although Darren initially despised him, and Larten believed him to be far too human to be a good vampire, he was later touched by Darren's refusal to betray him to Murlough, even though it might have saved Evra Von's life. They remained constant companions for many years, so that by the time they embarked of the hunt for the Lord of the Vampanaze, their bond was that of a father and son. In the fourth book, Vampire Mountain, we discover that Larten was once Arra Sails' mate, and grieved deeply after she was killed in the sixth book, by one of the vampeneze that Kurda Smahlt helped sneak into Vampire Mountain. In Killers of the Dawn, Larten Crepsley was killed when he was pushed into a pit of stakes by Steve Leonard. He died believing he had killed the Lord of the Vampaneze, but in reality he had only killed an imposter; the real Lord was Steve himself. Larten is portrayed by John C. Reilly in Cirque du Freak: The Vampire's assistant he is also VERY sexy.

Vancha March
Previously known as Vancha Harst, Vancha was first blooded a Vampaneze with his brother, Gannen Harst. He was never able to stomach the killing that went with his blood and thus abandoned the Vampaneze. Some time later, having been unable to overcome his urges and resolving to commit suicide, he was found by Paris Skyle, who took the risk of turning him from a vampaneze into a vampire.(As Vampire blood is poisonous to Vampaneze and vice versa so they both could have died) After many years of training and serving as a General, he then became a Vampire Prince. His hair is dyed green and his skin is a dark shade of red, due to his constant battle with the sun (he thinks that the sun, like any other enemy of the creatures of the night, can be defeated). He adheres to the old ways of the Vampires, making his own clothes from animal hides and fashioning his throwing stars from metal and stones. He refuses to use close combat weapons in favor of his bare hands. He claims to be a lady's man, though Darren Shan perceives him as having very little success in this area, owing to his wild appearance, bad smell and very poor manners. (except perhaps with Truska, the bearded lady from the Cirque Du Freak).

Prior to the outbreak of the War of the Scars, Vancha is absent from Vampire Mountain, in accordance with rules that one Prince should always be ready to assume control of the clan should Vampire Mountain fall into enemy hands. He serves on the frontline when the War begins, and is introduced as the last of the 3 hunters for the Vampaneze Lord, joining the band despite his personal disinterest in a war. He only fights to ensure the survival of his race, and is wary to the point of contempt of Desmond Tiny's meddling, even before Darren and Harkat discover the true extent of his power. He later comes to detest the Lord of the Vampaneze almost as much Darren, believing that the madman is defiling the code of honor the Vampaneze have followed for centuries. Following Mr Crepsley's death, Vancha pursues the Lord unsuccessfully for two years, before flitting to Darren's side when he is attacked by the Lord. He is wounded in the final confrontation by Gannen Harst, but survives his injuries, becoming the only hunter to live through the war. Lady Evanna chose to mate with him and Gannen Harst, thus having a baby from both a vampire and vampaneze to attempt to bring about lasting peace.

Harkat Mulds/Lefty
In the second book, Harkat Mulds was introduced as Lefty because he had a limp in his left leg. In Vampire Mountain, he reveals his real name, and the fact that he can speak. He went out of his way to protect Darren. In The Lake of Souls, it was found that Harkat used to be Kurda Smahlt and was sent by Mr. Tiny, who created Harkat from the remains of Kurda- wanting to ensure Darren's safety by sending him an ally for crucial events, choosing Kurda as someone who had been close to Darren in life and would therefore fight harder to protect him as a Little Person-, and sent him back to the past, so that Darren wouldn't die in his fight with the bear while traveling to Vampire Mountain, or the two boars in his Trials of Initiation. The name Harkat Mulds is actually an anagram of the name Kurda Smahlt shown by the teeth of the panther, as revealed in The Lake of Souls. Harkat later finds out that they were in the future by looking at post cards dated years later. Also in the Lake of Souls, Harkat had three identical scars on his left cheek, just like Kurda. In the lake of souls, Darren and Harkat accidentally bring Kurda back to life. Mr. Tiny revealed that Harkat and Kurda could not live in the same timeline. Harkat was prepared to die but Kurda asked to be killed so Harkat could live, reasoning that this was Harkat's time. Mr. Tiny stabbed Kurda and guaranteed that his soul would enter paradise, leaving Harkat with the memories of both.

Gavner Purl
A good friend of Mr. Crepsley and Darren. In Oceans of Blood, the second novel in The Saga of Larten Crepsley, it is revealed that Larten had gotten on a ship with humans and killed and drank the blood of them all, except a baby whose mother is possibly already dead. Mr. Crepsley takes him with him to Paris in Palace of the Damned where he raises the baby, who is later revealed to be Gavner Purl. He is later blooded by a vampire. Mr. Crepsley often teased him for his heavy breathing and snoring, also the fact that he could hear him coming from half a mile away. He is a vampire general and is later killed by Kurda Smahlt. His last words are "sorry if my snoring kept you awake..". Gavner's death is one of the main reasons Darren speaks of Kurda's treachery. Towards the end of book 6, it says they found Gavner's body stuffed between two cliffs near the tunnel he was killed in. In the story, An Affair of the Night, it shows that Gavner has a girlfriend named Liz Carr. At the end of the story, the couple break up and Gavner leaves for his trek to Vampire Mountain (book 4).

Gavner Purl is portrayed by Willem Dafoe in Cirque du Freak: The Vampire's Assistant.

Seba Nile
Mr. Crepsley's former teacher and Vampire Mountain's quartermaster. Seba Nile served as a big inspiration to Mr. Crepsley (while teaching Mr. Crepsley, before the series, he says he wishes to speak like Seba. Seba takes the matter further by plucking a hair from inside of Mr. Crepsley's nose whenever he said 
can't or won't or it's). Seba also dresses all in red, which is where Mr. Crepsley got the idea. He is the oldest living vampire by the end of the series, at over 700 years old. He fights in the battle that starts the War of Scars. His leg is hit with a sword and walks with a limp through the rest of the series.

Kurda Smahlt
A vampire General, invested to become a Prince. He was a pacifist and wished to unite the two clans of the vampires and vampaneze. When he heard that the Lord of the Vampaneze was soon to emerge, he took desperate measures. He planned for a group of vampaneze to infiltrate the mountain during his investiture, after he gained control of the Stone of Blood was killed and sentenced to death by the vampire princes as a traitor. He felt remorseful afterwards and agreed to become Harkat Mulds to make up for his wrongdoings.

Paris Skyle
A Vampire Prince and the oldest living vampire. At least 800 years old. Apparently knew William Shakespeare (he drank from him on his deathbed to preserve his spirit), sailed with Columbus and inspired Bram Stoker's Dracula. He is found dead under the body of a lifeless bear in book eight (due to their life-style, old Vampires often choose to fight a battle they know they possess no hope of winning rather than die peacefully).

Mika Ver Leth
The other Vampire Prince whom at first Darren despised. He dresses in all black, as that is his custom He has shiny, jet black hair [usually portrayed as long] and dark eagle-like eyes. He is stern and at first Darren was wary of him, but Darren warmed up to him. His features are sharp and raven-like. He was the youngest prince before Darren at a "mere" 270 years. He is very stern, gloomy and grumpy. He has many wrinkles on his forehead and sides of his mouth from always frowning. He rarely, if ever, smiles. Because of this he comes off as a very intimidating person. Like all Princes, he has huge muscles and is quite big [over 6 ']. He is very loyal to the Vampire Clan and prizes honor and good-standing above all else.

In an appearance at a book signing in New Jersey Darren Shan said that Mika was Arra Sails' mentor and perhaps even a rival of Larten Crepsley's for her affection.  This was confirmed in The Saga of Larten Creplsey.

Arrow
The most war-like of all the Princes, Arrow has killed more vampaneze than any other vampire. His hatred is a result of a vampaneze killing a human woman he loved. Having killed the culprit in revenge, he devoted all his energies to the clan from then on. Although like most Princes, his rank is testament to his combat prowess, Arrow is not unintelligent; it is he who suggests setting a challenge for Darren to clear Larten Crepsley's name. Later, following Kurda Smahlt's failed coup, Arrow also comes up with a way to pardon Darren for his failure in the Trials of Initiation, suggesting that he is made a Prince for facing execution to expose Kurda's treachery. In the battle against the vampaneze in Vampire Mountain, he demonstrates his skill with both swords and boomerangs.

Arra Sails
One of the few female vampires, but is considered the physical equal, or better, of the males. Darren won her respect after a fight on the bars, her respect is given by her shaking the hand of the chosen vampire of whom her respect is earned, which is hard to earn. Arra Sails prepared Darren for his third trial, the Hall of Flames. She is Larten Crepsley's love interest and ex-mate. She was killed in the battle that began the War of the Scars by the Vampaneze named Glalda Erefith. Larten had never been the same since her death. She asked Larten to make sure the Prince's spare Darren's life (he failed the trial and fled from his death sentence). After her death a picture of her is formed on the back of a frog, as a memory, at the cave of Lady Evanna, she gave the picture of her to Larten as a little gift when he, Darren and Vancha were travelling through. We learn in the prequel series, The Saga of Larten Crepsley, that Arra once was a servant/apprentice of Lady Evanna, but then left due to the fact that she wanted to become a vampire and then studied under the arm of Mika Ver Leth.

Vanez Blane
Vanez Blane is the Games Master in Vampire Mountain, and therefore the highest ranked tutor. He helped Darren train for three of his trials. He lost an eye fighting a lion many decades before the beginning of the series, then lost the other (book 6) when it was snagged with a knife during the battle that began the War of the Scars, though that didn't stop him tutoring he continued as a blind man, and still he won fights including a three on one fight against generals who were being rushed into war.

Cyrus
One of the few vampires blooded by Kurda. He was one of those who attacked Darren when he entered the Hall of Princes. Kurda tells him to stand down after saying too much blood has been shed. He then committed suicide.

Darius Shan
Son of Annie and Steve "Leopard" Leonard. Darius was conceived before Steve became a half-vampaneze. Steve left Annie for a time after learning the news. He later returned when it was too late for Annie to have an abortion, staying only long enough to tell her that he never loved her. As Darius grew up, Steve secretly visited him without his Annie's knowledge, and filled the boy's head with lies about how he is on crusade against vampires who are evil, as they kill when they drink blood. Steve implies that Darren Shan was the worst of all, though he does not mention that he is actually Darius's uncle. Steve bloods him as a half-vampaneze at some point before the Lord of the Shadows and teaches him how to use an arrow-gun. In the Lord of the Shadows, when the Cirque du Freak returns to Darren's hometown, Darius lures Darren into a trap at a football stadium, where his old friend Tom Jones is playing. Unknown to Darius, Steve's associates RV and Morgan James murder Tom Jones, and then lead Darren into a trap, where Darius shoots him with an arrow-gun. Darius then takes part in the raid of the Cirque du Freak in which Mr Tall is shot dead by Morgan James and Shancus Von is kidnapped. Darius is captured by Darren and Harkat when Morgan James is killed as they flee. Though Darren almost kills Darius in rage, Harkat persuades him to use the boy as bargaining chip to save Shancus. However, when he is taken to his father's base at the theater where Darren and Steve first saw the Cirque du Freak, Darius sees Steve's cruelty when he kills Shancus, just to see whether Darren will be prepared to kill his son in retaliation. Just as Darren is about to murder Darius, Steve reveals the boy is his nephew. Knowing the truth, Darren does not take Darius's life, and sets him straight about the truth regarding the Vampaneze. Darius then leads Darren to his home, which was also Darren's before he became a half-vampire. At the house Darren meets his sister Annie, and after discussing both Darius's past and Darren's, Darren re-bloods Darius as a half-vampire. The two survive, but Darren and his allies are immediately forced to set off for the Cirque du Freak, which has been taken over by Vampaneze, and guarded by police. Darius and Annie are sent away for their own protection, with Darren suggesting they hook up with Vampires to train at Vampire Mountain at a later date.

Vampaneze

Steve "Leopard" Leonard
Steve Leonard is one of the main characters of the Saga, appearing in the first book Cirque Du Freak as Darren's best friend. At times it was implied he was neglected as a child, and possibly took out his anger on his mother.

When Steve attends the Cirque du Freak with Darren, he recognizes Larten Crepsley as a vampire from one of his vampire books. After the show, Steve begs Crepsley to turn him into a vampire and take him on as his assistant. Crepsley initially agrees, but changes his mind after tasting his blood, which he accuses of being evil. When Steve is poisoned as a result of Darren stealing Crepsley's spider Madame Octa, Darren agrees to become a half-vampire and Crepsley's assistant in exchange for the cure. Following Steve's recovery Darren fakes his death, but Steve is unconvinced that his friend is really dead. After he is exhumed, Darren is attacked by Steve who accuses him of conspiring with Crepsley against him. In the end, Steve cannot bring himself to kill his friend, but swears to become the world's greatest vampire hunter and return to kill both Darren and Larten Crepsley in the future.

In book 8, Allies of the Night, the Hunters run into him in the city of Crepsley's childhood, where a group of Vampeneze are openly killing humans, just as Murlough was in the third book Tunnels of Blood. Although Darren, Harkat and Vancha trust Steve, Crepsley remains suspicious of him throughout the majority of the book. It is believed that Steve's actions are benevolent up until the climax of the book, when the vampires are ambushed by the vampaneze in the tunnel, where Steve takes Debbie hostage and reveals he is a half-vampaneze, having manipulated the Hunters the whole time. In the following battle, Debbie is taken by the vampaneze, but the Hunters manage to take Steve hostage.
 
In the following book, Killers of the Dawn, Steve remains hostage of the Vampires briefly, but helps ensnare the Hunters into another trap, this time having them cornered and arrested by human police, who have been led to believe the hunters are the killers. He is knocked out before the Hunters are taken into custody, and is placed in a hospital. However, while Darren is questioned by police, he overhears police saying that Steve has escaped, killing several innocents along the way. Steve is not seen again until the end of the story, where he is with the vampaneze in the Cavern. Crepsley agrees to engage him, Gannen Harst and the apparent Lord of the Vampaneze in battle above a pit of flaming stakes. As the Vampaneze Lord is believed to be dead, the Hunters believe the War of the Scars to be over, until the final stages of the book where Steve reveals the truth to Darren: that he himself is in fact the true Lord of the Vampaneze, the half-vampaneze who was disguised as a servant in Hunters of the Dusk and potentially the Lord of the Shadows. Steve leaves with his fellow vampaneze, with Gannen Harst knocking Darren out before he can alert his allies.

Steve does not appear in the following book, The Lake of Souls, except for a dream in which Darren is battling him and a dragon in a pre-apocylapse world.

Steve returns again in the penultimate book, Lord of the Shadows, with R.V., Gannen Harst, Morgan James and a new assistant, Darius, who is revealed to be his son. In the closing stages of the book, Evra's son Shancus is taken hostage by the vampaneze and taken to the stage area which was the former theater of the Cirque du Freak. Steve appears at the theater, where the Hunters arrive with Steve's son Darius as their hostage. Steve initially agrees to swap Shancus for Darius, but before the swap is made, he snaps Shancus' neck, killing him. In revenge, Darren prepares to kill Darius, only to learn from Steve that Darius is not just his son, but Darren's nephew through his sister Annie. 
 
In Sons of Destiny it is revealed that during Darren's absence, Steve returned to Darren's hometown after leaving, and befriended Annie Shan, and started a romantic relationship with her, impregnating her with Darius, before revealing to Annie that he has no love for her and leaving Annie with the baby. Several years later Steve secretly met with Darius and converted him into a half-vampaneze, brainwashing him with propaganda. However, he lied to Darius, telling him that vampaneze do not kill. After Darren performs the dangerous process of reblooding Darius as half-vampire, Darren and Vancha find Steve and the vampaneze at the Cirque du Freak, where they engage Steve and Gannen in battle. Vancha is wounded during the battle by Gannen and unable to fight any longer. Shortly afterward, Gannen is knocked unconscious, leaving Steve and Darren alone to fight. At the end of the long, vicious battle, Steve gains the upper hand when Darren suffers the after-effects of the reblooding, but his gloating leaves Darren with the chance to strike a fatal wound to Steve's heart. Desmond Tiny, who watched the final duel, reveals that he fathered both Darren and Steve. Desmond Tiny states he made them so that the winner of their battle could bring destruction to the human race as the Lord of the Shadows. As Steve the loser, lies dying and despairing over his cruel manipulation, Darren takes advantage of Steve's belief Darren made a deal with Mr. Crepsley to take Steve's "rightful place" as a half-vampire, goading Steve into stabbing him again. Darren then drags Steve into the river by which they fought, and both succumb to their injuries and drown.

When Darren is rescued from the Lake of Souls many centuries later in a possible future, after humanity has disappeared from Earth to be replaced by dragons, Evanna reveals that Steve's spirit is also trapped in the Lake of Souls. Evanna states that she has no intention of saving Steve, as Steve chose to do evil in his life, whereas Darren was merely manipulated as part of Desmond Tiny's plans. After Darren is sent back in time as a Little Person, he scares himself off so that he doesn't see Steve and Mr. Crepsley, cutting off the original chain of events that made Darren a vampire. It's unknown what happens to the Steve of said timeline, but he presumably lives a normal life and is still friends with Darren. 

Steve Leonard is portrayed by Josh Hutcherson in the movie. In The Vampire's Assistant movie, Steve became a Vampaneze much earlier than in the books. Murlough blooded him and Mr. Tiny assisted him to his destiny. He is not yet the Lord of the Vampaneze in the film but Mr. Tiny mentioned him leading his people or kind. Steve kidnapped Darren's family to lure him to a battle. Mr. Tiny wanted him to solve his differences with Darren later.

Gannen Harst
Vancha's brother - the two joined the Vampaneze together. Remained a Vampaneze when his brother was cast out. Gannen is the one who urges Steve to try the Coffin of Fire, which kills anyone who is not the Lord of the Vampaneze. When Steve emerged unscathed, Harst was elected as his personal protector, in the coming war against the Vampires, and remains at his master's side whenever possible. It is clear that Gannen strongly disagrees with many of his master's decisions, but remains loyal to him out of his devotion to the vampaneze. he is present at every confrontation between Steve and the Hunters until the final battle between himself, Steve, his brother Vancha and Darren Shan. During the battle, Gannen stabs and wounds Vancha, shortly before being attacked and knocked unconscious by R.V. 
Gannen survives the War of the Scars, and Evanna reveals that she bears twins from both Gannen and Vancha.

RV
(aka Reggie Veggie/Righteous Vampaneze)
A former friend of Darren's who first appears in The Vampire's Assistant as an eco-warrior, who befriends Darren, Evra and Sam Grest as his troupe is near where the Cirque du Freak are performing. He is a vegetarian and sensitive about animal rights, and so when he visits the Cirque, he is appalled to see the Wolf Man locked up and goats being killed, and stays behind when his group leaves to keep an eye on the Cirque. After witnessing Darren kill an animal as food for the Little People, R.V. angrily vows to bring the Cirque down. Darren is forced to threaten him into fleeing with his Vampire powers. However, R.V. later returns to free the Wolf Man from his cage. As R.V. wrestles with the lock, he is distracted when Darren appears, and his hands are bitten off by the Wolf Man. After accusing Darren of being responsible for his loss, R.V. runs away, screaming insanely.

In book 8 Allies of the Night, the crazed, hook-handed vampaneze responsible for the majority of murders in Mr Crepsley's home city is revealed at the climax to be R.V., who survived the encounter with the Wolf Man, and was taken in and blooded by the vampaneze, who replaced his hands with hooks. He claims to no longer be a vegetarian and relish meat, and has lost his peaceful views, obsessed with gaining revenge on Darren whom he still deems responsible for handicapping him. By the end of the book, R.V. has taken Debbie hostage and runs away. He returns in book 9 Killers of the Dawn, fighting in the Cavern along with his fellow vampaneze, battling Harkat, only to have his hooks removed by the Little Person. He survives the battle and leaves with the rest of the vampaneze.

In book 11 Lord of the Shadows R.V., along with vampet Morgan James, attacks the Soccer game and kills Tommy Jones. He is chased by Darren, whom he leads to his superiors, Steve Leonard and Gannen Harst. After Steve wounds Darren, R.V. leaves with them. He later attacks the Cirque du Freak, taking Evra's son Shancus hostage and to the vampaneze hideout. However, he starts to show doubts about his loyalties when he shows strong reluctance at the prospect of killing the snake-boy, and when he believes that he no longer has to kill the child, he shows signs of relief. It is then that Darren realizes that R.V. is not genuinely evil like Steve, but insane and misled. After Steve murders Shancus, R.V. is shocked, and leaves looking horrified.

In book 12 Sons of Destiny, it is revealed that Shancus' murder had a deep effect on R.V., who no longer knows whose side he's really on. When he has Debbie prisoner, although Steve instructs him to murder her, R.V. does not, and claims it was wrong of Steve to kill Shancus and that he thought his only real enemy was Darren. When the fighting begins, he lets Debbie go and flees.

R.V. takes no part in the fighting, and tries to escape the chaos until he is attacked by Cormac Limbs. He initially backs away, but is provoked into chopping Cormac's head off. He begins to cry and says that he wanted to help people and never kill anyone, only to fall further into madness upon seeing Cormac grow two heads.

He comes back later in the book, however, having ultimately switched sides, attacking Gannen in an attempt to save Vancha, accusing the vampaneze of being evil. He defeats Gannen, knocking him unconscious, only for Steve to stab him in the throat. In his dying moments, R.V. sees an imaginary pair of hands in place of his hooks, and dies happily.

Murlough
An insane and crazy Vampaneze who speaks in third person. Murlough terrorized Mr. Crepsley's home town until Darren and Mr. Crepsley stopped him. He abducted Evra, tortured him by cutting off some of his scales and tried to kill Darren's girlfriend; Debbie Hemlock. He was killed by Mr. Crepsley and after his death, his soul became trapped in the Lake of Souls. In the film, Murlough's name was changed to the spelling of Murlaugh. In the tenth book The lake of Souls, Darren and Harkat see Murlough's ghost.
In the Saga of Larten Crepsley, Murlough killed Wester's family.

He is portrayed by Ray Stevenson in Cirque du Freak: The Vampire's Assistant.

Glalda Erefith
A friend of Kurda Smahlt. A fierce vampaneze who fought against the Vampires in the battle that began the War of the Scars. They killed Arra Sails but are in turn killed by Darren Shan. It is described that they have a red birthmark on their left cheek. They were also in the cave when Gavner Purl was killed.

Humans

Annie Shan
Darren's younger sister. When Darren was showing Steve Leonard, Madam Octa, the spider Darren stole from Mr. Crepsley, Annie walked in shouting, and by shouting she made Darren lose concentration of Madam Octa while she was on top of the shoulder of Steve, Madam Octa bit Steve causing him to be paralyzed until cured. Mother of Darius Shan. She encounters Darren one last time in Sons of Destiny and had given birth to Darius out of wedlock with Steve. Steve also tries in the series to impregnate her with his child and soon succeeds. Darren got furious and almost tried to kill his own nephew for killing Shancus until Steve reveals that he is Darren's nephew.

Annie is portrayed by Morgan Saylor in Cirque du Freak: The Vampire's Assistant.

Dermot Shan
Annie's father, and the man Darren believes to be his father. However, it is revealed in Sons of Destiny that Mr. Tiny is Darren's biological father. The circumstances of Darren's conception are not explained, but Mr. Tiny says that Darren's mother has no knowledge of his real parentage, indicating that she did not have an affair with Mr. Tiny. In the eleventh book, Lord Of The Shadows, a woman tells Darren that Dermot has recently recovered from a mild heart attack.

He is portrayed by Don McManus in Cirque du Freak: The Vampire's Assistant.

Angela Shan
Mother of both Darren and Annie.

She is portrayed by Colleen Camp in Cirque du Freak: The Vampire's Assistant.

Tommy Jones
Tommy was one of Darren and Steve's best friends before they were blooded. He followed his childhood dream and became a professional footballer (British soccer player), playing as goalkeeper for a national team. His name is often referenced in the book to that of Welsh singer Tom Jones. He meets Darren 15 years after his supposed death when the Cirque du Freak returns to town. Darren tells his old friend a complex lie, in which he suffered from a terminal anti-aging disease, and faked his death so he could receive treatment from a traveling doctor. Tommy gives Darren a ticket to a football match he is playing in, but is brutally murdered by the insane half-vampaneze RV, to lure Darren into a trap. It is later suggested that he was likely aware of Steve's affair with Annie Shan, but did not have enough time to tell Darren.

Alan Morris
Darren's friend who showed them the flier he stole from his brother. Alan becomes a famous scientist, He specializing cloning. In Sons of Destiny, Evanna reveals Mr Tiny influenced his work, eventually leading to the creation of the dragons from a combination of dinosaur cells. Humanity is fated to lose control of them in the far future.

Sam Grest
A local boy that Darren and Evra became friends with when they stopped for a show in book two. He liked pickled onions and had a large family with many pets. Sadly, he was brutally killed and ripped to shreds by the wolf man, but Darren drank from him to preserve his soul. He was also the second person Darren ever drank from, which he only did to preserve Sam's memories. The first was Alan Morris. Although never touched in on the main story, he seemed to possess somewhat clairvoyant abilities (see short stories "Transylvania Trek, and Bride of Sam Grest"). He inadvertently predicted the manner in which he died, and the existence of the vampaneze Murlough when he was only nine years old. Sam appears in the manga version of the third book, Tunnels Of Blood, in which Darren summons Sam's ghost. However, Sam never made an appearance in the original novel. In the twelfth book, Sons Of Destiny, Sam's soul appears in Mr. Tiny's secret lair. Sam recognizes Darren and salutes him.

Debbie Hemlock
Darren's off and on girlfriend. Darren meets her when she is a young girl, about 13 years old. Later on, when she is an adult, she helps the vampires in the war of the scars and has the idea for human fighters for the vampires like the vampets for the vampaneze; she calls this new army the vampirites. She loves Darren but refuses to kiss him because he still is one of her students and he has aged only two years. She agrees to kiss him after the second purge because he will look more like an adult, this moment never arrives however because Darren dies before the end of the second purge. Debbie is described as being a pretty, kind-hearted, joyful girl with dark hair and skin.
In the movie version, she is replaced by Rebecca, a girl around the same age as Darren. Rebecca and Darren, on the other hand, do kiss.

Walter Blaws
A school inspector who made Darren go to Mahler's where he met Debbie Hemlock as his teacher, when Darren returned to Mr Crepsley's city to stop the vampaneze killing innocent humans in a series of well-publicized attacks. When Darren is wrongly arrested and accused of the murders, Mr Blaws comes to the prison where Darren is held to confirm his identity.

Tara Williams
A sweet, shy girl in Darren's English class. She sat next to Darren in his English class. She was a student of Debbie's before being murdered. Darren was said to kill her but she was really killed by a vampaneze. Most likely by RV.

Alice Burgess
Police Chief Inspector of Larten Crepsley's birthplace. She later allied herself with the vampires and aids them in the War of Scars by recruiting an army of street people who can use modern weapons in the War of Scars, the vampirites.

Spits Abrams
A mad, cannibalistic sailor/pirate who Darren and Harkat meet in The Lake of Souls. Later, Harkat finds out that they weren't in the past but in the future. He was a cannibal and planned to fish out souls and eat them. Then as he tried to kill Darren and Harkat, he was killed by a dragon who blasted fire onto Spit's head, who jumped into the lake to extinguish it, drowning in the progress. It is possible that he is partially responsible for the death of Madame Truska's husband and daughter, who claimed her family was murdered by "ëvil fishermen" in the same book that Spits is introduced – and he introduces himself as being a fisherman. Darren Shan has confirmed that Spits Abrams is Daniel Abrams in The Saga of Larten Crepsley Book 2 - Ocean of Blood on Shanville Monthly March 2019.

Oggy Bas
Short for Augustine Bas. A minor character who at first sight is mistaken by Darren to be Annie's son. He is also Darius' friend. He helps Annie Shan with many jobs.

Mr. Dalton
Mr Dalton is Steve's favorite teacher and is the one that informs Darren that the freak circus are illegal and banned.

Mrs. Quinn
The geography teacher in the first book.

Mrs. Leonard
Steve Leonard's mother. First appears in Cirque Du Freak, where Steve acts cruelly towards her while Darren is visiting them and is later grief-stricken when it appears that Steve may die. In the Lord of the Shadows, Darren is informed of her death, and it is suspected that Steve may have been involved.

Jimmy Ovo
Appears in The Vampire's Assistant and in Brothers to the Death. A pathologist. In the Vampire's Assistant, Darren and Mr Crepsley visit Jimmy, and Darren refuses to drink from a corpse in Jimmy's possession. Brothers to the Death reveals that Jimmy's father, James, was a Holocaust survivor who was rescued by Kurda Smahlt from Nazi death camps. Jimmy appears himself later in the novel, where he is with Gavner Purl to attend a performance of the Cirque's in 1960s New York City. It is revealed James' family worked as morticians before the Second World War, although it is commented that Jimmy is staying in a similar field of work to that of his family.

Jesse and Donna Hemlock
Debbie's mother and father, makes only one short appearance in the third book, they are used as bait to lure Murlough into a trap where he is killed by Mr. Crepsley.

Vampets 
The vampets are humans recruited by the vampaneze for the War of the Scars. While vampaneze are not allowed to use projectile weapons, vampets can use them freely since they are not bound with any of the vampaneze laws. Vampets wear a brown shirt and black pants, and they are all shaven-headed and have a purple "V" tattooed above either ear.

Morgan James
Former police guard. He worked with Alice Burgess until He revealed he was a vampet whilst interrogating Darren in a jail cell. One of Steve's main body guards. Had half of his face blown off by a gunshot by Alice Burgess. Later his head is chopped off by Harkat. He also killed Mr Tall by shooting him in the abdomen in Lord of the Shadows.

Mark Ryter
A vampet in book 9 who was tortured and killed by Vancha March.

Vampirites 
Vampirites are a bunch of street people recruited by Debbie Hemlock and Alice Burgess in order to help the vampires in the War of the Scars. The Vampirites are mostly homeless people, but they all strike back against society in the big battle of book 12. Vampirites are the Vampires' counterpart to vampets. They, like vampets, are allowed to use projectile weapons.

Declan
One of the street people that was recruited by Debbie Hemlock and Alice Burgess to help the vampires in the War of the Scars. He and his friend, Little Kenny, 
helped save Darren when he was wounded during his encounter with Steve "Leopard" Leonard in Darren's hometown.

Little Kenny
A friend of Declan's who helped him save Darren.

Cirque du Freak members

Evra Von
Close friends with Darren, and also known as the snake-boy, or the snake-man as he grows older, is a performer at the Cirque Du Freak. He helped Mr. Crepsley and Darren defeat Murlough in the third book, but was injured permanently when Murlough ripped scales off of Evra's right shoulder. He became one of Darren's best friends, yet because Evra ages normally and Darren ages 1/5 the normal rate, their bond thins as time goes on. Near the end of the last book, as Darren watches the Cirque Du Freak once more, he comments that it would be too difficult to watch the snake-boy 
perform, reflecting on the pain that would later befall him. Evra was born to normal parents, but they were horrified when they saw him, and left him at an orphanage at the age of two (although in the movie he claimed Mr Tall found him in a dumpster when he was two days old), where he was picked on by the other children. When he was four, he was sold to a traveling circus where he was abused, locked in a glass tank, and forced to feel ugly, useless, and freakish. Seven years later, when he was eleven, he was rescued by Mr. Tall, joined the Cirque Du Freak, and stayed for the rest of his life. In book 12 he almost killed Steve himself for revenge for killing Shancus (his oldest son) but is stopped by Mr. Tiny. Evra speaks with an American accent and is shy, which Darren thinks is due to his abusive childhood. He is described as slender, with long yellow and green hair and is around 14–15 years old in books 1,2 and 3. After a time skip of several years, Darren returns to find that Evra has fallen in love with another freak named Merla who throws her ears like boomerangs and has three children, Shancus (who was named after Darren, was the oldest, and considered Darren his godfather even though he wasn't), Urcha (he always felt different because he was the only one without the snake skin) and Lilia (the smallest). Shancus performs with him at the Cirque until he died when Steve snapped his neck and hung him in a noose.

He is portrayed by Patrick Fugit in Cirque du Freak: The Vampire's Assistant.

Merla Von
Merla Von is Evra's wife and the mother of his three children. She can detach her ears and use them as kind of boomerangs. The means by which she became part of the Cirque Du Freak are never mentioned inside the book series. She often uses the threat of the Wolfman when her children misbehave, particularly when they're annoying Alexander Ribs, trying to mess around with his xylophone-like bones. Merla's described throughout the series as pretty and nice. She is also highly intelligent and lovable.

Shancus Von
The oldest child of Evra and Merla, Along with Lila, Shancus has scales like his father. He believes Darren is his godfather, because he was named after him. He is killed after Steve snaps his neck.

Urcha Von
Evra and Merla's middle child. He is the only one out of his siblings who does not have scales, and so is deeply upset. However, Darren gives Shancus a new snake for his birthday, and his old snake was passed down to Urcha.

Lilia Von
Evra and Merla's youngest child. She is the only girl out of her siblings, and like Shancus, she has scales.

Rhamus Twobellies
Rhamus, as the name implies, has two stomachs. He is said to be able to eat anything in a matter of minutes. Some of the things Rhamus has been said to have eaten include a full grown elephant, or a tank, and can wrap forks and spoons around a chain inside his stomach and pull it back out again. In fights, he belly flops people to death.

He is portrayed by Frankie Faison in Cirque du Freak: The Vampire's Assistant.

Truska
A woman who can grow an indestructible beard at will and then suck it back in. She was the one who gave Darren his pirate costume. It is often hinted that she is in a relationship with Vancha March in the books and Larten Crepsley in the movie. In Sons Of Destiny she fights her opponents using and controlling her beard like snakes.
In the saga of Larten Crepsley Truska is mentioned as being a fish like creature covered in long hair called a skelk and is the bride of another skelk, Velap, in the book. Vancha brings her to the Cirque du Freak at the end of the saga of Larten Crepsley after her husband and daughter are killed. This is because, after they have been widowed, skelks have to live apart from the others for twenty or thirty years in mourning. In the saga of Darren Shan Truska mentions that her family were killed by evil fishermen. These fishermen were most likely sailors who thought the skelks were evil and hunted them.
Skelks live in the Scottish seas where they have inspired the myths of mermaids, although some Scottish know them to be called Skelkies. They migrate to warmer climates during the Winter and return in the Spring. Truska is little creature also called fantasy.

She is portrayed by Salma Hayek in Cirque du Freak: The Vampire's Assistant.

Gertha Teeth
One of Cirque Du Freak's female performers. Her teeth are extremely strong, and her performances are often joined with Rhamus's.

Played by Kirsten Schaal in the movie.

Cormac Limbs
When his limbs are removed (cut off), he can grow them back at will. Cormac Limbs discovered his powers when he accidentally cut off part of his nose when he was younger. Throughout Darren's first meeting with Cormac, he explains that he can regrow all of his body parts as far as he knows, although states he has never tried regrowing his head for the risk of death. However, when his head is cut off by R.V. in Sons of Destiny, he re-grows two heads (each slightly smaller than the original), driving R.V. insane. The two heads talk at 
the same time and they do things at the same time. He is portrayed by actress Jane Krakowski in Cirque du Freak: The Vampire's Assistant, as Corma Limbs.

Hans Hands
One of the Cirque's performers. He can walk and run on his hands faster than a normal man can run on his feet. He was introduced in the first book and claimed his father was born with no legs and learned to walk with his hands. He was killed in the sons of destiny.

He is portrayed by Jonathan Nosan in Cirque du Freak: The Vampire's Assistant, in which he is very limber, agile, supple, swift and topsy-turvy.

The Wolf Man
A ferocious beast who is half human and half wolf. The mix of wolf and human blood has driven him mad. For that reason, he must be locked up or else he will kill all the time. He killed Darren's friend Sam Grest and bit off R.V.'s hands. For these reasons, Darren despises the wolf man. He is possibly a connection to the Demonata saga, as one of the main themes is lycanthrophy. However this was denied by Darren Shan, as a question asked by a fan at the Darren Shan message boards, Questions for Shan section.

He is portrayed by Tom Woodruff, Jr. in Cirque du Freak: The Vampire's Assistant.

Alexander Ribs
More of a comedy act than a scary one which was needed to calm down the audience after the terrifying start with the wolfman. The skinniest man that Darren has ever seen, he played the 'London Bridge is Falling Down', songs by the Beatles and TV theme tunes by opening his mouth and hitting his bony ribs with a drumstick. (Cirque Du Freak) He was killed in the last book, Sons Of Destiny

Alexander Ribs is portrayed by Orlando Jones in the movie adaptation of this book Cirque Du Freak - The Vampires Assistant.

Jekkus Flang
A ticket man at the Cirque who later has his own act. He excels at throwing and juggling knives. At the end of Sons of Destiny he is seen young not yet has his own act and is in charge of the gifts also commands the little people.

Sive and Seersa
The Twisting twins, Sive and Seersa that are identical twins and were contortionists like Bradley Stretch. Their act involved twisting their bodies around each other so they looked like one person with two fronts instead of a back, or two upper bodies and no legs. They were skillful and interesting, but dull compared to the rest of the performers. Often used as a fake climax to the shows, only to be tricked by Evra Von's snake.

Bradley Stretch
A Cirque performer with the ability to stretch himself into all sorts of shapes. He went missing and was (apparently) eaten by the Little People some years before Darren joined the Cirque. It states Evra saw the bones and a bracelet (a gift from a Bradley Stretch fan) left over when cleaning the Little People's things. Evra fed Bradley's remains to the wolf-man, and when Darren and Evra contemplate this later, Evra says that he must have tasted rubbery - Darren and Evra burst out laughing.

Others

Desmond "Des Tiny" Tiny
Desmond "Des Tiny" Tiny is known to the Vampires and the Cirque du Freak as a meddling trickster of immense magical power, having created Little People and the most sacred relics of the Vampires and Vampaneze, and a number of prophecies. He also fathered Lady Evanna. He has short white hair, thick glasses, and pudgy face, with a warm but mocking smile. He wore a shabby yellow suit and a pair of green wellington boots. He has six toes, webbed feet, carries a heart-shaped watch, and has six cat-like claws on each foot. He sometimes asks people to call him Des, which makes him Des Tiny, or Destiny. He is universally feared for his love of chaos and cruelty; he openly admits to eating children and enjoys the idea of thousands dying in natural disasters.

He predicts the rise of the Lord of the Vampaneze and tells the Vampires they must destroy him before he comes of age, informing them that Darren Shan and Mr. Crepsley are two of the three who will get the four chances. The later books in the series elaborate on his powers further, revealing him as a time traveler capable of resurrecting the dead, and that Hibernius Tall was also his son and Evanna's twin. Desmond possesses many original objects designed by famous people such as the Mona Lisa painting by Leonardo da Vinci. He collects many things from mankind except books due to his lack of interest in reading (mainly fiction).

In Sons Of Destiny, Mr Tiny proclaims he is the father of Darren Shan and Steve (Leopard) Leonard, having engineered the war between the Vampires and Vampaneze simply to throw the human race back into the bloody chaos he loves, and pitted his own sons against each other just so one would become the Lord of the Shadows, a tyrant who would rule over the ruined world. Darren manages to destroy these schemes by letting a mortally injured Steve stab him to death.

Having lost his dictator and his means of destroying the world temporarily, Desmond turns to his daughter Evanna to conceive a child who would pitch the Vampires and Vampaneze back into war. She agrees on the condition that Darren, an innocent victim of Tiny's meddling, is freed from the Lake of Souls, but she double-crosses her father by conceiving twins of both Vampire and Vampaneze, which will create a new species that can freely breed with both races, erasing any divisions between them. She also sends a reincarnated Darren into the past to plant his diaries in the hands of an author. These books are updated with the revelations about Tiny's meddling, and will eventually expose him and permanently wreck his efforts to stop humanity finding peace.

He is portrayed by Michael Cerveris in Cirque du Freak: The Vampire's Assistant.

Hibernius Tall
The leader of the Cirque Du Freak who was loved and highly respected by the performers, having offered sanctuary for unusual humans through the Cirque for many years. He has telepathic powers, precognition, and can move as fast as lightning. He is well acquainted with many vampires, his closest friend amongst them being Larten Crepsley. In Hunters of the Dusk he appears to be bound by similar universal laws to Lady Evanna, unable to intervene in the War of the Scars. In The Lord of the Shadows, he confirms Evanna's prophecy regarding the Lord of the Shadows to Darren's horror. The Cirque then comes under attack from Steve Leopard's subordinates, and Mr Tall abandons his neutrality by trying to save the life of Shancus Von, on the grounds that they have attacked his family. He is then brutally shot by Morgan James. As he lies dying, Mr Tiny and Evanna appear at the Cirque to bid him farewell, and it is revealed Mr Tall is Mr Tiny's son and Evanna's brother.

He is portrayed by Ken Watanabe in Cirque du Freak: The Vampire's Assistant.

Lady Evanna
A "witch" with many powers (who takes great offense to anybody who calls her that). She normally wears ropes instead of clothing. She is Desmond Tiny's daughter, Hibernius Tall's sister and Darren's, and Steve's half sister. Evanna breeds frogs whose pigmentation can change, allowing her to create images with their backs. She makes a number vampire friends, and is the one responsible for Mr Creplsey's trademark scar. She was created when Desmond Tiny mixed vampire and wolf blood to create two children that were born to a wolf. She is the only entity who is able to carry a vampire/vampaneze child. Her other powers are similar to Mr Tiny's, but are considerably weaker, and she is always bound by her inability to directly interfere with the affairs of humanity. As such she always strives to be a neutral observer in the War of the Scars, despite the animosity and mistrust this creates amongst her friends, and the distress she causes Darren by pronouncing he will become the Lord of the Shadows and ruin mankind. At the climax of the War of the Scars, she learns that Darren Shan and Steve Leopard are her half-brothers, having been directly created by Mr Tiny to throw the human world into chaos. Shocked out of her neutrality, Evanna then seeks to upset Tiny's plans, while also trying to save Darren from his imprisonment in the Lake of Souls. When Mr Tiny offers to release Darren in exchange for her conceiving a child of either a vampire or a vampaneze, who could tip the clans back into war, she doublecrosses her father by conceiving twins of both races.

Lord of the Shadows
A destructive all powerful being first mentioned when Darren assists Evanna in treating Harkat's nightmares, and sees a shadowy figure in the Little Person's visions. Evanna explains that this figure will destroy the modern world and rule over the ruins of humanity for hundreds of years, and that only his identity is uncertain, being either the Lord of Vampaneze or Darren himself. Darren does not dwell on this until he and Harkat discover the latter's true identity in a strange primeval land, which they later conclude was the future. Harkat thinks this is only one of many paths the world could take, but a petrified Darren realises the destruction is certain, and he may well be its architect as the Lord of the Shadows. At the climax of the series, despite his fear, Darren becomes vengeful and vicious in his efforts to destroy his nemesis Steve Leopard, and although he learns he will kill his close friend Vancha March on his future destructive path, he is unable to give up his thirst for revenge. After Darren kills Steve, Mr Tiny explains he fathered both children just so he could create the terrible future through the Lord of the Shadows. However, Darren lets himself be stabbed by a dying Steve, sacrificing his life. After centuries of imprisonment in the Lake of Souls, Evanna rescues him and confirms his theory; with both dead, the Lord of the Shadows can never come into being.

Lady Evanna's twins
Lady Evanna's unborn, nameless twins. Following Darren's sacrifice after killing Steve, Mr. Tiny had nobody to end the War of the Scars and become the Lord of the Shadows. He therefore turned to Evanna, begging her to mate with either a vampire or a vampaneze, as that child could renew the war and bring about humanity' downfall. However, Evanna conceived twins of both a vampire and a vampaneze, making each of them one-third vampire, one-third vampaneze, and one-third Evanna. The fathers were both Vancha March and Gannen Harst, an example of intentional heteropaternal superfecundation. This was an attempt to unite the two clans, thus ending the War of the Scars.

Guardians of Blood
Humans who eat vampire organs in order to live longer (up to 160 years), they provide vampires with blood in exchange for dead vampire's organs. (As it says in Vampire Mountain, they save the brains and heart for important events such as weddings.) It is unknown whether or not they are the 'Kulashkas' which Darren and Harkat met in the future or whether they descended into the Kulashkas.

Madam Octa
Larten Crepsley's spider. Madam Octa is a telepathic spider, and can do many different tricks. She is highly intelligent and poisonous, she can even be trained to control how much poison she injects. She can live up to 30 years, according to the monk who gave it to Mr. Crepsley. In the first book, she bites Steve causing Darren to go to Mr. Crepsley to ask for an antidote, but the condition is Darren must become a half-vampire in order to save him. Later in the series, Darren releases Madam Octa into the cave of spiders inside Vampire Mountain, where she mates and produces offspring, which are named after Darren; The Ba'Shan's spiders.

Ba'Halens' Spiders
Spiders that live within Vampire Mountain. Are revealed in Book 5 Trials of Death. The cobwebs of these spiders have healing abilities and aid Darren quite a bit after his second trial. Seba Nile is supposedly the only person who knows of their existence and whereabouts.

Ba'Shan's spiders
Offsprings of Madam Octa and Ba'Halens spiders. They appear in the book The Lake of Souls the spiders are under the temple where Darren and Harkat were looking for the holy liquid. They have been altered because they were blind. Seba Nile named them after Darren.

Streak
A wolf that Darren encounters on his trek to vampire mountain. He was nicknamed by Darren after the design on his fur. Streak, along with the rest of his pack, travel to vampire mountain with Darren, Mr. Crepsley, and Gavner for some of the way before departing. Streak and his pack reappear in book 6 to help Darren survive after he falls into the river. Darren stays with the pack to recover from injury before going back to the mountain to warn the vampires of the threat Kurda poses.

Magda
A she wolf from Streak's pack. She was nicknamed by Darren after his Grandmother. She was one of the wolves Darren first encountered after being attacked by the mad bear. She helped Darren back up vampire mountain, and dies on the journey. Darren believed she knew she would die soon, and wanted to die honorably, much like vampires.

Rudi
A wolf cub in Streak's pack. He was the wolf who discovered Darren after he was washed to the base of vampire mountain. Rudi also means famous wolf. Rudi was first introduced to Darren as a cub in the fourth book (Vampire Mountain) Darren developed a unique fondness for the cub and was sad when Rudi departed, he next returns to Darren in the sixth book, as a young adult. He along with Streak and another she wolf nursed Darren back to health in his time of need.

The Dark-Furred wolf
A wolf in Streak's pack who Darren never nicknamed but he was identified by his darker fur. He disapproved of Darren staying with the pack, and often snarled angrily at him. Darren tried to stay away from him as much as possible. Eventually Streak and the dark-furred wolf got into a fight. Neither of them were seriously injured but afterward the dark-furred wolf

Other classmates in the first book 
 Dave Morgan - Was on Darren's soccer team, but broke his leg.
 Sam White - Was on Darren's soccer team, but family moved and went to another school.
 Danny Curtin - Was on Darren's soccer team, but stopped playing to be with his girlfriend. Darren thought he was a fool .
 Sheila Leigh - Danny Curtin's love interest.
 Delaina Price - A girl near the front of the classroom in Darren's math class with Mr Dalton, who wasn't very good at math.

References

Fictional vampires
Fictional half-vampires
Saga of Darren Shan
The Saga of Darren Shan